Finney–Lee House is a historic home near Snow Creek, Franklin County, Virginia. It was built in 1838–1839 and is a two-story, three-bay brick dwelling. It has a gable roof and exterior end chimneys. The interior features Federal and Greek Revival design details. Also on the property are the contributing front walkway, pack house (c. 1930), two tobacco barns (c. 1900), a cemetery, and a road trace.

It was listed on the National Register of Historic Places in 1997.

References

Houses on the National Register of Historic Places in Virginia
Houses completed in 1839
Federal architecture in Virginia
Greek Revival houses in Virginia
Houses in Franklin County, Virginia
National Register of Historic Places in Franklin County, Virginia